Coxsackie-Athens is a rural New York State school district located along the Hudson River, approximately 20 miles south of Albany. Known as C-A, to people in the region, Coxsackie-Athens has around 1,200 students K-12.

The district has four schools: Edward J. Arthur Elementary; Coxsackie Elementary; Coxsackie-Athens Middle School; and Coxsackie-Athens High school.

The district has a satellite campus in the Village of Athens and a main campus in the Village of Coxsackie where the district office is located. All the schools are located in Coxsackie, except for the Edward J. Arthur school in Athens.

Staff
As of the 2016–17 school year, the principals of schools were:
Coxsackie Elementary School: Karen Miller
Edward J. Arthur Elementary School: James Martino
Coxsackie Middle School: David Proper 
Coxsackie High School: Heath C. Quiles

The Superintendent of the schools is Randall Squier.

Sports 
Coxsackie-Athens is part of Section II in New York State and the Patroon Conference.  Patroon Conference members include: Coxsackie-Athens, Greenville High School, Catskill High School, Cairo-Durham High School, Hudson High School, Chatham High School, Maple Hill High School, Taconic Hills High School, and Rensselaer.

External links 
District Website

Education in Greene County, New York
School districts in New York (state)
School districts established in 1948